Arquata Scrivia (local dialect: Auquâ) is a comune (municipality) in the Province of Alessandria in the Italian region Piedmont, located about  southeast of Turin and about  southeast of Alessandria.

Arquata Scrivia borders the following municipalities: Gavi, Grondona, Isola del Cantone, Serravalle Scrivia, and Vignole Borbera.

History
It is located on the left bank of the Scrivia river. The name derives from the Latin arcuata (arched), due to the presence of an aqueduct supplying the nearby Roman town of Libarna, on the Via Postumia.

It is mentioned as a castrum (fortress) in the 11th century, and later was contended between the Republic of Genoa and the commune of Tortona: after they signed a peace in 1227, they dismantled the castle. In 1313, it was given by emperor Henry VII to the Genoese Spinola family, who were named marquisses of the town in 1641. Three years later Arquata obtained also the right to strike coins of its own.

It was sacked by French troops in 1796. The following year it was annexed to the Ligurian Republic. After the fall of Napoleon Bonaparte, it became part of the Kingdom of Sardinia-Piedmont.
During the First World War, a team of Red Cross nurses headed by Mrs Marie Watkins used the theatre at Arquata Scrivia as a recreation room and canteen for British soldiers.

References

External links
 Official website
 First World War history

Arquata Scrivia
Henry VII, Holy Roman Emperor